Byron Black and Jared Palmer were the defending champions but only Black competed that year with Grant Connell.

Black and Connell lost in the first round to Max Mirnyi and Kevin Ullyett.

Rick Leach and Andrei Olhovskiy won in the final 4–6, 6–1, 6–2 against Jiří Novák and David Rikl.

Seeds

  Byron Black /  Grant Connell (first round)
  Yevgeny Kafelnikov /  Daniel Vacek (quarterfinals)
  Sébastien Lareau /  Alex O'Brien (quarterfinals)
  Libor Pimek /  Byron Talbot (first round)

Draw

References
 1996 Kremlin Cup Men's Doubles Draw

Kremlin Cup
1996 ATP Tour